Dublin Harbour may refer to:
 Dublin Bay, bay of the Irish Sea around Dublin city
 Dublin Port, the port of the city of Dublin, Ireland
 Dublin Harbour (UK Parliament constituency), a constituency of the UK Parliament 1855–1922, and of Dáil Éireann 1918–1921

See also
 Dublin Harbour Police, associated with Dublin Port